Bolinus brandaris (originally called Murex brandaris by Linnaeus and also Haustellum brandaris), and commonly known as the purple dye murex or the spiny dye-murex, is a species of medium-sized predatory sea snail, an edible marine gastropod mollusk in the family Muricidae, the murex snails or the rock snails.

This species is known in the fossil record from the Pliocene (age range: from 3.6 to 2.588 million years ago). Fossil shells of this species have been found in Cyprus, Spain and Italy. It was used by the Phoenicians in ancient times to extract imperial Tyrian purple dye.

Distribution and habitat
This snail lives in the central and western parts of the Mediterranean Sea and has been found on isolated coral atoll beaches in the Indian Ocean and South China Sea. It was known since ancient times as a source for purple dye and also as a popular food source under various names, among which sconciglio, from which comes the word scungilli. This species lives on rocks in shallow water.

Human use 
This species, like many other species in the family Muricidae, can produce a secretion which is milky and without color when fresh but which turns into a powerful and lasting dye when exposed to the air. This was the mollusc species used by the ancients to produce Tyrian purple fabric dye.

Sea snails of the species Banded dye-murex Hexaplex trunculus were also used to produce a purple-blue or indigo dye. In both cases, the mollusks secrete the dye in the mucus of their hypobranchial glands.

In Spain, and more specifically on the Mediterranean coast and the Gulf of Cádiz, they are called cañaílla, and are appreciated as food.

It is a cannibalistic species; evidence suggests that intensive breeding by the ancient Minoans resulted in pierced shells, perhaps by other snails, due to the population density in breeding tanks.

Biology

Shell
The size of the adult shell of Bolinus brandaris can reach about 60 to 90 mm. The shell is usually golden brown with a very long siphonal canal and a rounded body whorl with a low spire. There is a row of spines that corresponds to the end of each growth stage.

Species

Infrasubspecific names are not recognized by ICZN.

 Bolinus brandaris bicauda - Coen 1933
 Bolinus brandaris coronatus x polii - Stigwan 2019
 Bolinus brandaris elongata - Stigwan 2019
 Bolinus brandaris cagliaritanus - Stigwan 2019
 Bolinus brandaris longispinus - Coen 1914
 Bolinus brandaris nasalis brevis - Stigwan 2019
 Bolinus brandaris nivea - Bucquoy, Dautzenberg & Dollfus, - 1882
 Bolinus brandaris polii - Coen 1933
 Bolinus brandaris rubiginosus - Stigwan 2019
 Bolinus brandaris trispinosus - Locard 1886
 Bolinus brandaris trituberculatus - Stigwan 2019
 Bolinus brandaris varicosus - Settepassi 1970

Synonyms

Aranea cinera Perry, 1811
Haustellum clavatum Schumacher, 1817
Murex brandariformis Locard, 1886 
Murex brandaris Linnaeus, 1758
Murex brandaris brandellus Monterosato in Settepassi, 1970 
Murex brandaris brevispinus Settepassi, 1970
Murex brandaris commixtus Settepassi, 1970
Murex brandaris insculptus Settepassi, 1970
Murex brandaris longiaculeatus Settepassi, 1970
Murex brandaris ponderosus Settepassi, 1970 
Murex brandaris spinosus Settepassi, 1970
Murex brandaris subcornutus Settepassi, 1970
Murex brandaris var. aculeatus Philippi, 1836
Murex brandaris var. canaliaspinosus Serradell, 1912
Murex brandaris var. compacta Pallary, 1912
Murex brandaris var. conica Serradell, 1912
Murex brandaris var. delgadoi Serradell, 1912
Murex brandaris var. devians Dautzenberg, 1904
Murex brandaris var. diplacantha Dautzenberg, 1904
Murex brandaris var. longispina Coen, 1914
Murex brandaris var. monospinosus Serradell, 1912
Murex brandaris var. multicostatus Serradell, 1912
Murex brandaris var. nivea Bucquoy, Dautzenberg & Dollfus, 1882
Murex brandaris var. novemcostatus Serradell, 1912  
Murex brandaris var. quadrispinosa Dautzenberg, 1904
Murex brandaris var. robusta Dautzenberg, 1904 
Murex brandaris var. spinotuberculatus Serradell, 1912
Murex brandaris var. spirocaudata Coen, 1934
Murex brandaris var. ternispinosa Coen, 1914
Murex brandaris var. torta Dautzenberg, 1904
Murex brandaris var. trifariaspinosa Frauenfeld, 1869
Murex brandaris var. trispinosa Bucquoy, Dautzenberg & Dollfus, 1882
Murex brandaris var. tuberculata Hidalgo, 1890
Murex brandaris var. tudiculoides Coen, 1934
Murex brandaris varicosus Settepassi, 1970
 Murex clavaherculis Roding, 1798
 Murex coronatus Risso, 1826
 Murex trispinosus Locard, 1886
 Murex tuberculatus Roding, 1798
 Purpura fuliginosa Röding, 1798

See also 
 Tyrian purple
 Hexaplex trunculus

References

Further reading

 Radwin, G. E. & D'Attilio A. (1986). Murex shells of the world. An illustrated guide to the Muricidae. Stanford Univ. Press, Stanford, x + pp. 1–284 incl 192 figs. + 32 pls.
 Vasconcelos P., Barroso C. M. & Gaspar M. B. (2017). "Meat yield of Bolinus brandaris (Gastropoda: Muricidae): Comparative assessment of the influence of sex, size and reproductive status". Scientia Marina 81(2): 255-267. .

Muricinae
Gastropods described in 1758
Taxa named by Carl Linnaeus
Animal dyes